This is a list of episodes for the TV series Glenn Martin, DDS. Some episodes were titled differently in the U.K. Where this is the case the U.K. title is listed underneath the U.S. title. Some of these alternative titles have also been used in the U.S. for repeat showings.

Series overview

Episodes

Season 1 (2009–10)

Season 2 (2010–11)

Notes

External links
 

Glenn Martin
Glenn Martin
Glenn Martin
Glenn Martin